Glipa masatakai is a species of beetle in the genus Glipa. It was described in 1962.

References

masatakai
Beetles described in 1962